Echeta semirosea is a moth of the family Erebidae. It was described by Francis Walker in 1865. It is found in the Amazon region, French Guiana and Brazil.

References

Phaegopterina
Moths of South America
Moths described in 1865